Lauri Kaila is a Finnish entomologist and researcher of biodiversity, specializing in Lepidoptera, at the Finnish Museum of Natural History of the University of Helsinki. As of 2018, Kaila authored 171 species within the family of Elachistidae.

Publications
See Wikispecies below.

References

External links 

Living people
Taxon authorities
Finnish entomologists
Finnish biologists
Finnish zoologists
Academic staff of the University of Helsinki
Year of birth missing (living people)